Murder in Alaska constitutes the intentional killing, under circumstances defined by law, of people within or under the jurisdiction of the U.S. state of Alaska.

The United States Centers for Disease Control and Prevention reported that in the year 2020, the state had a murder rate near the median for the entire country.

Felony murder rule
In the state of Alaska, the common law felony murder rule is codified in Alaska Statutes § 11.41.100(a).  Alaska's law regarding felony murder is very specific, and unlike most felony murder rule laws, which make all felony crimes that cause murder that of the first degree, delegates some felony murders to second degree murder.

First degree murder
Alaska makes the following offenses equate to first degree murder if they result in death:

 Sexual offenses and kidnapping of a child under 16
 Criminal Mischief in the first degree
 Terroristic Threatening in the first degree

Second degree murder
The following offenses equate to second degree murder if they result in death:

 Arson in the first degree
 All other Kidnapping
 Sexual Assault in the first and second degrees
 Burglary in the first degree
 Escape in the first or second degrees
 Robbery
 Misconduct involving a controlled substance
 Acting to commit a felony with a street gang
 Criminal negligence involving a child under 16, if that person had been convicted before under certain specific crimes involving a child under 16

This is enumerated entirely at Alaska Statute Sec. 11.41.100(a)(2)-(5) (first degree murder) and 11.41.110(a)(3)-(5) (second degree murder).

Penalties
Source:

References

Murder in Alaska
U.S. state criminal law